Rhodoferax fermentans is a psychrophilic, motile bacterium from the genus Rhodoferax. It is a photosynthetic bacteria.

References

External links
Type strain of Rhodoferax fermentans at BacDive -  the Bacterial Diversity Metadatabase

Comamonadaceae
Bacteria described in 1992